Johann Sebastian Bach started composing cantatas around 1707, when he was still an organist in Arnstadt. The first documented performances of his work took place in Mühlhausen, where he was appointed in 1708.

Models

Bach's early cantatas are "" (chorale concertos) in the style of the 17th century, different from the recitative and aria cantata format associated with Neumeister that Bach started to use for church cantatas in 1714. The Altbachisches Archiv, a collection of 17th-century vocal works, mostly by members of the Bach family, initiated by Bach's father Johann Ambrosius, contained works in the older style. Bach also had some acquaintance with Johann Pachelbel's works, although there is no evidence that Bach and Pachelbel met. Bach grew up in Thuringia while Pachelbel was based in the same region, and Bach's elder brother and teacher Johann Christoph Bach studied with Pachelbel in Erfurt. There has been recent speculation that Bach wanted to pay tribute to Pachelbel after his death in 1706. Wolff points out the relation of Bach's early cantatas to works by Dieterich Buxtehude, with whom Bach had studied in Lübeck.

Compositions
The texts for the early cantatas were drawn mostly from biblical passages and hymns. Features characteristic of his later cantatas, such as recitatives and arias on contemporary poetry, were not yet present, although Bach may have heard them in oratorios by Buxtehude, or even earlier. Instead, these early cantatas include 17th-century elements such as motets and chorale concertos. They often begin with an instrumental sinfonia or sonata (sonatina). The following table lists the seven extant works composed by Bach until 1708, when he moved on to the Weimar court.

The cantata for the inauguration of a town council is richly scored for trumpets, woodwinds and strings.

Christ lag in Todesbanden, BWV 4

An early version of the Christ lag in Todesbanden, BWV 4, was probably first performed in Mühlhausen on Easter , as a presentation piece that was part of Bach's test to become an organist at the Divi Blasii church. The composition is a per omnes versus chorale cantata based on Martin Luther's hymn "Christ lag in Todesbanden". The cantata is only known in its later Leipzig versions. The cantata shows similarities to a composition of Johann Pachelbel based on the same Easter chorale.

Aus der Tiefen rufe ich, Herr, zu dir, BWV 131

Aus der Tiefen rufe ich, Herr, zu dir, BWV 131 is probably Bach's oldest preserved cantata. It was commissioned by Georg Christian Eilmar, pastor at St Marien (St Mary) in Mühlhausen.

Gott ist mein König, BWV 71

A cantata for the same event a year later, which was commissioned to be printed, is however not extant. The BWV number for the missing work is BWV Anh. 192.

Actus Tragicus, BWV 106

Der Herr denket an uns, BWV 196

Nach dir, Herr, verlanget mich, BWV 150

Nach dir, Herr, verlanget mich, BWV 150 was possibly first performed on the third Sunday after Trinity, . The authenticity of the cantata has been doubted. One of Pachelbel's works appears to be referenced in the cantata.

Lobe den Herrn, meine Seele, BWV 143

Lobe den Herrn, meine Seele, BWV 143 is a cantata for New Year (or Council election in Mühlhausen?), which would have originated between 1709 and 1711. Its authenticity has been doubted.

Meine Seele soll Gott loben, BWV 223

Meine Seele soll Gott loben, BWV 223 is a largely lost (BWV Anh. I) cantata that has been attributed to Johann Sebastian Bach and George Frideric Handel. If written by Bach it probably originated in his Mühlhausen time.

Reception
Christoph Wolff writes:

The Bach scholar Richard D. P. Jones writes in The Creative Development of Johann Sebastian Bach:

References

Sources
 
 
 
 
 
 
 

Early cantatas, Bach's
1700s in music